"Mō Kimi Dake o Hanashitari wa Shinai" is Aya Kamiki's third single. The main track were used as the Detective Conan ending theme for episodes 438-458. This single debuted at #11 on the Oricon Weekly Singles Chart and sold 21,967 copies in total.

Track list

CD 
 
 
  (instrumental)

Sales
Initial week estimate: 11,521   
Total estimate: 21,967

References 
GIZA studio (2006), Aya Kamiki Official Web Site
Oricon Style (2006),  Oricon Profile

Aya Kamiki songs
2006 singles
2006 songs
Giza Studio singles